John Sankey may refer to:
 John Sankey, 1st Viscount Sankey, British lawyer, judge and politician
 John Sankey (drummer), Australian heavy metal drummer